Lithuanian Badminton Federation is a national governing body of badminton sport in Lithuania.

Federation also organising annual national Lithuanian National Badminton Championships and Lithuanian International.

Structure 
As of 2020:
 President: Aurimas Kamantauskas
 General Secretary: Vaidotas Sruogys
 Head of Coaches Council: Kęstutis Navickas
 Head of Referees Council: Živilė Simonaitytė

References

External links 
Official website

Badminton
1962 establishments in Lithuania
Sports organizations established in 1962
National members of the Badminton World Federation
Badminton in Lithuania